Future Nostalgia is the second studio album by English and Albanian singer Dua Lipa, released on 27 March 2020 by Warner Records. Lipa enlisted writers and producers such as Jeff Bhasker, Ian Kirkpatrick, Stuart Price, the Monsters & Strangerz, and Koz to create a "nostalgic" pop and disco record with influences from dance-pop and electronic music, inspired by the music that Lipa enjoyed during her childhood.

The album spawned six hit singles, along with the title track as a promotional single. "Don't Start Now" was released on 1 November 2019, as the album's lead single, attaining both critical and commercial success. The song peaked at number 2 on the Billboard Hot 100 chart. "Physical" and "Break My Heart" were released as the second and third singles, respectively, both reaching the top 10 on the UK Singles Chart. "Hallucinate" and a remix of "Levitating" featuring DaBaby were released as the fourth and fifth singles on 17 July and 1 October 2020, respectively; the latter earned the album its second top-two single on the Hot 100 and the third top-ten of Lipa's career, following "New Rules" (2017), and would go on to become the most played song of 2021 in the United States.
"Love Again" was released as the sixth single in France on 11 March 2021 and globally on 4 June 2021. The album was originally scheduled to be released on 3 April 2020 but was moved forward after leaking in its entirety two weeks earlier. To promote the album, Lipa embarked on the Future Nostalgia Tour, which commenced in February 2022 after being postponed three times due to the COVID-19 pandemic.

Upon its release, Future Nostalgia received universal acclaim from music critics, many of whom praised the production, its cohesion and Lipa's stylistic evolution. Commercially, the album topped the charts in fifteen countries and reached the top ten in thirty-one countries. In the United Kingdom, it peaked atop the UK Albums Chart for four non-consecutive weeks, becoming her first album to do so as well as garnering her first-ever nomination for the Mercury Prize, and earning the Brit Award for British Album of the Year. At the 63rd Annual Grammy Awards, Future Nostalgia was nominated for Album of the Year and won Best Pop Vocal Album, whilst "Don't Start Now" was nominated for Record of the Year, Song of the Year and Best Pop Solo Performance.

Future Nostalgia was succeeded by its remix album, Club Future Nostalgia, released on 28 August 2020 which received positive reviews from the critics . A French edition of Future Nostalgia was released on 27 November 2020, which yielded the single "Fever" which became the longest charting single in France. A reissue of the album, subtitled The Moonlight Edition, was released through Warner on 11 February 2021, along with its lead single, "We're Good".

Background 
After the release of Dua Lipa: Complete Edition in October 2018, the expanded deluxe edition of Lipa's debut album, and the single "Swan Song" in January 2019, released in promotion of Alita: Battle Angel (2019), Lipa confirmed that she was working on a new album. In October 2019, Lipa began teasing the album as a new "era," before clearing her social media later that month to announce the lead single, "Don't Start Now". Lipa stated that she cleared her social media in order to prove to herself that social media wasn't real, that one could post and choose to use platforms any way they wanted. She further elaborated that she wanted to start fresh with her new album, but she would always have her memories. Whilst promoting "Don't Start Now", Lipa confirmed that she would be announcing the album in late November or early December 2019, along with the release of the title track.

On 1 December 2019, Lipa revealed the album title through a tattoo on her left bicep with the title, Future Nostalgia, while also announcing its accompanying arena tour of the same name and that the album would be released in 2020. The following month, three songs ("Physical", "Break My Heart", and "If It Ain't Me", an unreleased collaboration with Normani) leaked online in a security breach. Shortly after on 29 January 2020, Lipa announced that the album would be released on 3 April of that year. The following day, the track list was revealed and the album was made available for pre-order. In late March, the entire album leaked and the release was brought forward by a week to 27 March 2020. Lipa additionally expressed her concern about releasing the album during the COVID-19 pandemic.

Concept

Cover artwork
The cover artwork of Future Nostalgia was shot by French photographer, Hugo Comte, who also handled the creative direction and the photographs associated with the album's campaign, with Guillaume Sbalchiero handling the design. It was shot on 13 November 2019, and Lipa revealed it on 29 January 2020, along with the album's release date announcement. During shooting the promotional photography, Comte had one song on repeat for each shot to get Lipa in the mood for him to get the right shot.

The cover artwork of Future Nostalgia features Lipa in a Googie-esque retro vehicle, one that could be seen in the Pulp Fiction (1994) 1950s-themed restaurant scene. A dark sky with a blue moon, which was a stylistic choice, appears behind her. Lipa wears a 1950s-style button-down pink shirt, which is tied in a knot around her waist. Her accessories include gold hooped earrings, with a normal one in one ear and a misshaped one in the other, and numerous rings. She also wears long white gloves, which she holds the steering wheel with. Lipa has her blonde and brunette hair up in a bun.

Title
Lipa originally intended to call the album Glass House. After working on the album for nearly a year, Lipa came up with a new album title, Future Nostalgia, while on the way to a radio show in Las Vegas around the time of the 2018 American Music Awards. After figuring it out, Lipa messaged her A&R, in which they responded that it's like a baby name, they couldn't tell anyone. She wanted to create a record with the nostalgic memories of her childhood and the music her parents listened to and put a modern spin on it with futuristic elements, which is why she ultimately went with the title. It is meant to describe "a future of infinite possibilities while tapping into the sound and mood of some older music." "Glass House" was later used as a lyric in the album's title track.

Recording
Lipa began work on Future Nostalgia in January 2018 and finished in November 2019. However, during the first year of production, she was still promoting her first album on the Self-Titled Tour and was still figuring out the direction she wanted to go in. Lipa had begun thinking of ideas for the album before Dua Lipa was released in June 2017. After figuring out the album's title, she worked backwards figuring out the sound and lyrical content she desired. She challenged herself to break out of her comfort zone to make music that could sit alongside her favourite classic pop songs, being inspired by Gwen Stefani, Madonna, Kylie Minogue, Moloko, Blondie, and Outkast. After touring, Lipa aspired to have a more live element on the record, mixed with a modern electronic production, but to still have the pop sensibility of her first record. Lipa thought that her sound had "naturally matured."

The majority of the album was recorded in a nine-month period after figuring out its title, where she had sessions every day, including ones at Geejam Studios in Jamaica. Lipa recorded upwards of nearly 60 songs for the album, including unreleased collaborations with producers Max Martin, Nile Rodgers, Mark Ronson, and Pharrell Williams, as well as a collaboration with Normani titled "If It Ain't Me", and "Bad To You", a song with Ariana Grande. "Bad To You" was later released by Grande, Normani, and Nicki Minaj on the Charlie's Angels: Original Motion Picture Soundtrack after Lipa and Grande were unable to finish their respective parts due to scheduling conflicts.  A planned collaboration with Katy Perry titled "Ball & Chain" was also canceled due to scheduling issues. Another song that was intended for the album, but did not make the cut, "Retrograde", was later recorded by Aleyna Tilki and released as her debut English-language single. Lipa's single "Un Día (One Day)" with J Balvin, Bad Bunny, and Tainy was revealed to be recorded during sessions for Future Nostalgia.

Music and lyrics
Future Nostalgia is a dance-pop, electropop, nu-disco, pop-funk, and synth-pop record, with several 1980s and retrofuturism tropes, and elements of Eurodance, hi-NRG, house, techno, and R&B. Described by Lipa as a "nostalgic" pop record that "feels like a dancercise class," she took inspiration from the music of the 1970s, 1980s, 1990s, and 2000s to create a sound that felt familiar and brand-new at the same time. The album's structure includes sticky-sweet choruses, and catchy pop hooks, while it has campy productions, consisting of funk bass guitars, electronic beats, rubbery basslines, robotic vocoder backing vocals, chunky synths, lush strings, percolating drums, house-influenced piano chords, and disco strings. The album has themes of the transformative nature of romance, sex, inequality, empowerment, self-possession, the exploration of vulnerability, falling in love, breaking up, vulnerability, equality, hope, flirtation and affection.

Critics notes similarities between the tracks on Future Nostalgia and the works of Blondie, Chic, Daft Punk, Lady Gaga, Gloria Gaynor, Debbie Harry, Jamiroquai, Madonna (Confessions on a Dance Floor, 2005), Kylie Minogue (Fever, 2001), Moloko, Olivia Newton-John, No Doubt, Outkast, Prince, and Nile Rodgers. Neil Z. Yeung of AllMusic described the sound of Future Nostalgia as "'70s disco, '80s dance-pop, and '90s club jams." In her review for The Independent, Helen Brown stated that Lipa "channels the zingy, electro-ambitions of the 1980s with remarkable freshness." Pitchforks Anna Gaca viewed it as "a collection of sophisticated, hard-bodied pop-funk that gives way to slick, [Minogue]-inspired disco." Mesfin Fekadu from ABC News regarded the album as "a collection of upbeat, dance-flavoured, power pop gems."

Songs
Future Nostalgia opens with its title track, a playful and fun synth-pop and electro-funk song, with house, hip hop, and disco elements. It has an electronic production, that includes electroclash synths, disco beats, funk and grunge bass-popping, and a jazz piano progression. In the song, Lipa name-drops its producer, Jeff Bhasker, and American architect, John Lautner, while vocally making use of falsetto and spoken word deliveries. Lyrically, it deals with themes of feminism and self-reflection. The following track and lead single, "Don't Start Now", has empowerment themes and sees Lipa addressing an ex-lover about moving on from a relationship, using direct bullet point instructions. She uses her lower-register vocals, over a production consisting of cowbells, accented disco strings, and a rhythm guitar loop. Musically, it is a nu-disco song with elements of dance-pop and Eurodance. Synth-pop cut, "Cool", has inspirations from 1980s music and Prince. The song is about the initial rush of falling in love, painting a picture of a summer romance, with confidence and vulnerability themes, and reckless, youthful energy. Driven by a funk bass, glitter gel noises and a drum line embody the production, whilst Lipa contributes R&B vocals, with hopeful tones.

"Physical" has a message of female strength, not needing a man to save them, with lyrics about an intense and lustful relationship. A power pop and synth-pop song, it includes dance-rock, dark wave, and Italo disco elements, while Lipa's lower register vocal performance uses deadpan, spoken word, belts, and chants. The song shares a chorus line with Olivia Newton-John's 1981 single of the same name, and includes sawtooth wave synths, a synth flute, and hi-hats in its production. "Levitating" is an electro-disco, pop-funk, and nu-disco track, with elements of dance-pop, electronic, 1990s pop and R&B, power pop and space rock genres. It includes a Blondie-influenced rap by Lipa, while having nu-disco rhythms, disco strings, and talk box vocals production-wise. Lyrically, Lipa exposes her feelings for a significant other, through numerous outer space references. Electro-R&B track, "Pretty Please", has disco-pop details and soft-spoken vocals. Driven by a bass and click, the song has a stripped-back production, emphasizing its guitars and synths, while also including cowbells and pitch-modulated vocal effects. The lyrics see Lipa attempting to be really chill at the beginning of a relationship, but realizing that is unlike her, as she pleas for stress relief from her partner who slows that down.

Described by Lipa as her "festival song," "Hallucinate" is a disco and house track, with dance, electro swing, psychedelic, and synth-pop elements. Lipa showcases her higher vocal register, and contributes a 1990s diva hook. Lyrically, the song describes how crazy love can make one feel, over a production consisting of pianissimo synths, hi-hats, and orchestrations. Lipa's favourite song on the record, "Love Again", is a dance-pop, disco, and electro song, with a classic sound, that includes a sample of the trumpet from Lew Stone's 1932 recording "My Woman". The 21st-century nu-disco production is made up of orchestrations, including 1970s disco strings, violins, and an acoustic guitar. Its lyrics have heartbreak and personal growth themes, which see a faithful Lipa offering her heart to a new partner after an upsetting breakup. Lipa describes "Break My Heart" as a "celebration of vulnerability," seeing her question whether a new love will leave her broken-hearted, with lyrics comparing it to the COVID-19 pandemic's social distancing measures. It interpolates rhythm guitar melody from "Need You Tonight" (1987) by INXS, alongside Europop and dance beats, disco violins, and a techno-adjacent bassline as the production. Musically, it is a disco and dance-pop song, with a retro-futuristic sound, and elements of funk and house.

"Good in Bed", is a hip hop, R&B and funk-pop song, which was widely compared to the works of Lily Allen. Its production uses off-kilter jazz piano plinking, gum-popping sound effects, and lo-fi keys, with fairy-like backing vocal harmonies, and Lipa contributing high octave whispers. The album's sole explicit track, it uses bad, mad, and sad rhymes, with lyrics about a relationship where good sex is the only thing holding two people together. Future Nostalgia closes with "Boys Will Be Boys", a baroque pop and chamber pop ballad turned anthem, with gospel elements. Lipa makes use of belting and chanting, over a melodramatic melody, disco beats, layered choral arrangements, marching band drums, and orchestral strings. Lyrically, the song speaks about the growing pains girls experience and how they have to grow up so fast, taking aim at male violence, sexual harassment, toxic masculinity, double standards, and misogyny, while having empowerment and feminism themes.

Release and promotion 

The album was issued on 27 March 2020, by Warner Records, Lipa's second to be released under the label. The standard edition was released on CD, cassette, vinyl, digital download and streaming. The vinyl was released on both coloured vinyl and a picture disc and the cassette was released in gold, pink, blue and yellow colours. The album was also released with a boxset that contains a yellow 12" vinyl, a photography book from the album's photoshoot, an art print, a thank you note from Lipa, a tattoo replica of Lipa's "Future Nostalgia" tattoo, stickers and one of five polaroid images. The Japanese edition of the album was released on CD on 3 April 2020, the album's intended release date. It contains three additional tracks, two remixes of "Don't Start Now" and a remix of "Physical". Two new editions of the album were released on 27 November 2020: a new CD edition with "Levitating" feat. DaBaby and "Fever" with Angèle as bonus tracks packaged in a slipcase and the bonus 2CD edition which includes the original album along with "Levitating" feat. DaBaby as a bonus track on the first disc plus the DJ Mix version of Club Future Nostalgia remix album on the second disc. The first was released exclusively in France while the latter was released worldwide.

Lipa headlined the Sydney Gay and Lesbian Mardi Gras on 29 February 2020, where her set included the first live performance of "Physical". Lead single "Don't Start Now" was promoted with award show performances, including ones at the 2019 MTV Europe Music Awards, 2019 American Music Awards, and 2019 ARIA Music Awards, as well as talk show performances on The Graham Norton Show, The Ellen DeGeneres Show, and The Late Late Show with James Corden. "Break My Heart" received virtual performances on The Tonight Show Starring Jimmy Fallon, Big Brother Brasil 20, and Graduate Together: America Honors the High School Class of 2020. On 30 March 2020, "Break My Heart", "Love Again" and "Pretty Please" were performed in a live stream for Amazon Music UK. On 29 May 2020, Lipa performed "Love Again", "Pretty Please" and "Don't Start Now" in a charity livestream for the COVID-19 pandemic. She performed acoustic versions of "Break My Heart" and "Pretty Please" for the FIFA 21 world premiere. "Levitating", "Pretty Please", "Love Again", and "Don't Start Now" were performed during her NPR Tiny Desk Concert. Lipa performed "Boys Will Be Boys" at the Billboard Women in Music ceremony, where she also was honoured with the Powerhouse Award.

On 28 October 2020, Lipa announced her Studio 2054 livestream concert, in support of the album, which took place on 27 November 2020. Lipa also announced the Future Nostalgia Tour in support of the album. The tour began on 9 February 2022 in Miami, and consists of 69 announced shows. The tour was postponed from its original 2020 spring-summer date due to the COVID-19 pandemic.

Singles 
"Don't Start Now" was released as the album's lead single on 31 October 2019. The song was serviced to contemporary hit radio formats in Australia, Italy, the United Kingdom, and the United States. It received acclaim from music critics, many of whom praised its disco and 1980s elements, while also noting the growth in Lipa's sound and vocals. The song was a commercial success peaking at number two on both the UK Singles Chart and the US Billboard Hot 100, with the latter becoming her first top three entry on the chart, while also being certified double platinum in both countries. It additionally entered the top 10 in over 40 other countries, while also being certified platinum or higher in over 10 separate countries. The song's music video was directed by Nabil Elderkin and filmed in Brooklyn. It features clips of Lipa at a masquerade ball and in a crowded nightclub. Numerous remixes for "Don't Start Now" have been released, including ones by Dom Dolla, Kungs, and Regard.

"Physical" was released as the album's second single on 30 January 2020, after its title was revealed in a Spotify advertisement earlier in the month. The song was serviced to contemporary hit radio formats in the United Kingdom, Australia, and Italy. The song received positive reviews from critics, with many praising its 1980s elements. It reached number three on the UK Singles Chart, and number 60 on the US Billboard Hot 100, despite not having had an American radio release. It has been awarded a platinum certification in Canada, Spain, and the United Kingdom, while going diamond in Brazil. The music video for "Physical" was directed by Catalan production team, Canada, and filmed at Fira de Barcelona in Plaça d'Espanya, Barcelona. The visual is based on a Venn diagram by Swiss artist duo Peter Fischli and David Weiss from their series of works Order and Cleanliness (1981), and features Lipa and a group of dancers dancing in a warehouse, while incorporating anime-inspired animation. The song was further promoted with the release of a 1980s-inspired workout video, directed by Daniel Carberry, and featuring Lipa and the class members leading viewers through fitness routines. A remix of "Physical" featuring South Korean singer Hwasa of girl group Mamamoo was released on 17 March 2020.

"Break My Heart" was announced as the album's third single on Sunrise, and was released on 25 March 2020, after previously being scheduled to be released two days later. The song was serviced to contemporary hit radio formats in Australia, Italy, the United Kingdom, and the United States, becoming the album's second official single in the US, while also being serviced to adult contemporary radio formats in the latter two countries. It generated positive reviews from critics, who complimented its production. The song became Lipa's highest debut on the US Billboard Hot 100, where it debuted at 21. It eventually reached number 13 on the chart and number 6 on the UK Singles Chart. It has additionally peaked within the top 10 of 17 other countries. The Henry Scholfield-directed video was shot in Bulgaria and inspired by Pedro Almodóvar and the 1990s. It features a set of slide clips, with Lipa in many scenarios, going from vulnerable to empowered. An animated video directed by Marco Pavone was also released, featuring Lipa in search of a crystal heart and fighting off giant robots. Remixes by Jax Jones and Joris Voorn were also released.

"Hallucinate" was announced in July 2020 to be released as the album next single, officially impacting contemporary hit radio formats in the United Kingdom on 17 July 2020 as the album's fourth single. Like its predecessor, it received positive reviews for its production, while commercially reaching number 31 on the UK Singles Chart. The Lisha Tan-directed animated music video was inspired by the 1970s and Studio 54, and created during the COVID-19 pandemic, with teams of animators working in Paris, London, and Los Angeles. The visual features Lipa going on a psychedelic, hallucinatory adventure after smelling a flower. Remixes of "Hallucinate" by Paul Woolford and Tensnake have been released.

After being announced as a single in August 2020 and being promoted to radio as a promotional single, a remix of "Levitating" featuring American rapper DaBaby was released as the fifth single from Future Nostalgia on 1 October 2020. It also serves as the album's third single in the United States, impacting contemporary hit radio formats in the country five days later.

"Fever" with Belgian singer Angèle was released on 29 October 2020 as the sixth single exclusively in France and Belgium promoting the French edition of Future Nostalgia. The song peaked at number 79 on the UK Singles Charts, as well as reaching the summit of both the Ultratop Wallonia and Flanders charts of Belgium and in France. It additionally entered the top 10 of charts in Hungary and Switzerland. The song received a music video on 6 November 2020 that was directed by We are from L.A., and features Lipa and Angèle exploring the streets of London. The two promoted the single with a performance at the 2020 NRJ Music Awards.

"Love Again" was announced on 11 March 2021 to be released as the album's next single, officially impacting contemporary hit radio formats in France as the album's sixth single.

Promotional single
The title track was confirmed to be released as a promotional single in November 2019 and was officially released as the only one on 13 December 2019, being released to keep Lipa's fans engaged until 2020. It was met with mixed to positive reviews from critics, with many praising the production and lyrics, and many commenting on its experimental nature. The song became moderately successful in Europe, entering charts in Ireland, Scotland, and Spain, while reaching number 63 on the UK Singles Downloads Chart, and 11 on the NZ Hot Singles Chart. The song was accompanied by a lyric video, set in a retro 1960s house on a small lake, where Lipa dances, drinks alcohol and hits golf balls.

The Moonlight Edition
Following the release of Future Nostalgia, Lipa teased the release of tracks that did not make it to the album's standard edition, stating "I have a couple of songs that I've worked on, and that I kind of put aside for a second wind, so that's all to be discussed". Lipa further explained that she had always planned a reissue as she was very "cutthroat" when choosing the standard edition songs. In April 2020, she confirmed Future Nostalgia would receive a deluxe reissue and further teased it while serving as a guest Watch What Happens Live with Andy Cohen the following month. In July 2020, a fan commented on one of Lipa's Instagram posts asking for the release of the Future Nostalgia B-sides; Lipa replied and confirmed their release and also stated that she has "enough [music] to hold [her fans] all the way through till 2022".

Lipa described "Fever" as an introduction to the B-sides. In a YouTube chat with her fans for the release of its music video, Lipa announced that the B-sides would be released in 2021. In January 2021, Lipa further teased the B-sides release with a post on social media with the caption "B-sides are on the way". She further teased it through until the next month. On 4 February 2021 Dua officially announced the reissue day and its title, Future Nostalgia: The Moonlight Edition. The Moonlight Edition was released one week later on 11 February 2021, alongside the reissue's lead single "We're Good".

Critical reception

Future Nostalgia received widespread acclaim from critics. At Metacritic, which assigns a normalised rating out of 100 to reviews from professional publications, the album has an average score of 88, based on 19 reviews. Aggregator AnyDecentMusic? gave it 8.5 out of 10, based on their assessment of the critical consensus. According to Metacritic, Future Nostalgia is the 15th most acclaimed album released in 2020.

Writing for NME, Rhian Daly wrote that "Future Nostalgia is a bright, bold collection of pop majesty to dance away your anxieties to... if only for a little while". Chris Taylor of The Line of Best Fit praised Lipa's direction for the album, saying "Future Nostalgia is an artist in total control. It's built on such an addictive carefree spirit that it's hard not to let loose and go with it. The greatest pop star of this generation? That's for you to decide. But Future Nostalgia makes a very convincing argument that Dua Lipa just might be". Chris Willman of Variety praised the album's musical direction, writing "after calling it a great disco record, we might also call Future Nostalgia a great MTV-era album that just happens to be not of the MTV era". Writing for Rolling Stone, Brittany Spanos also praised the album's musical direction, writing "Future Nostalgia is a breathtakingly fun, cohesive and ambitious attempt to find a place for disco in 2020".

Writing for DIY, Elly Watson wrote "this album has proved: Dua will be going down in pop history as one of the best". Laura Snapes of The Guardian complimented Lipa's choice of songs, writing "The 11-track Future Nostalgia offers neither features nor filler, and makes a strident case for Lipa as a pop visionary, not a vessel". Michael Cragg of Crack summarised the album as "packed with full-throttle choruses, supple melodies and lashings of attitude, Future Nostalgia is a neon-hued sound of one of the world's biggest pop stars smashing it out of the park". Similarly, Craig Jenkins of Vulture commended the "sturdy" songs, also writing that Minogue and Madonna are their "predecessors" sonically. Jenkins concluded that Lipa has "only scratched the surface of what she's capable of".

In his Substack-published "Consumer Guide" column, Robert Christgau gave the album a three-star honorable mention and called it an "Olivia Newton-John tribute as dance smash as what-me-despair placebo, that deserves props for adding two keepers to that canon", namely the title track and "Good in Bed".

Year-end lists
Future Nostalgia placed in the top ten of the year-end lists of several publications, including being viewed as 2020's best album by Entertainment.ie, Gaffa, GQ, People, Slate and Vogue India.

Awards and nominations

Commercial performance
Future Nostalgia debuted at number two on the UK Albums Chart with 34,390 units, only 550 units behind 5 Seconds of Summer's Calm. In its second week, it reached the summit of the chart, with Future Nostalgia becoming Lipa's first UK number one album. The album would go on to top the chart for three more non-consecutive weeks. On 17 April 2020, it was certified Silver by the British Phonographic Industry (BPI) for selling over 60,000 units in the UK. The album holds the record for having the lowest one-week sales while at the top of the chart in the modern era, when it was number one the week beginning 15 May 2020 with sales of only 7,317. It was certified double Platinum by the BPI in 2022, having shifted over 600,000 units to date in the UK. In October 2021, the BBC's music correspondent Mark Savage noted that Future Nostalgia was the only British album released since the start of 2020 to have been certified Platinum by the BPI.

Just like in the UK, Future Nostalgia entered the Australian album chart at number two before rising to the top in April 2020. After charting for almost a year the album climbed back to the number one spot in March 2021. It was certified Gold by the Australian Recording Industry Association for the 35,000 units sold. Following the release of the album's Australian tour edition vinyl in April 2022, the album returned to number one for a third non-consecutive week in its 108th week on the chart.

The album topped the record charts of 14 countries, including Ireland, Finland, the Netherlands, New Zealand, Portugal, and Spain.

Future Nostalgia debuted at number four on the US Billboard 200 dated 11 April 2020, with 66,000 album-equivalent units, including 18,000 pure album sales. A major improvement over her self-titled debut album (which peaked at number 27), it became Lipa's first top 10 album on the chart. The following week, the album dropped to number 8, with sales declining by 43% to nearly 38,000 units. It remained within the top ten in its third week. As of December 2020, the album has sold 931,000 album-equivalent units in the United States. After the release of its reissue The Moonlight Edition in February 2021, the album surged back at number seven on the Billboard 200, reaching the top 10 for the first time in 10 months with 32,000 album-equivalent units earned, increasing by 58% compared to the previous week. On the chart dated 27 March 2021, following Lipa's performance at the 63rd Annual Grammy Awards, one year after its initial release, the album reached a peak of number three on the chart, moving 37,000 album-equivalent units that week.

According to the International Federation of the Phonographic Industry (IFPI), Future Nostalgia was the tenth most successful album of 2020 worldwide, with 3.3 million album-equivalent units sold. In 2021, the album once again made IFPI's Global Album All-Format Chart at number six.

The album is currently 6th most streamed album of all time on Spotify with over 10 Billion streams.

Impact 
According to Billboard, as of 2022, Future Nostalgia is one of the 15 best-performing 21st-century albums without any of its singles being number-one hits on the Billboard Hot 100. According to Tom Corson, co-chairman of Warner Records, Lipa has "the benefit of being a pioneer" for being "the first major pop star to release an album in quarantine". David Levesley of GQ magazine described Future Nostalgia as "the decade's first great pop album" and explained that the album "balances stadium anthems with also being a gospel of feminine excellence for all the teens looking to her for inspiration". while Chris Willman of Variety called the album the "Reigning Dance-Pop Album of the Century", compared it to Taylor Swift's Folklore, and further wrote that both albums "barely seemed to exist in the same world, let alone genre, but they effectively captured a populace's polarized reactions to the cessation of normal life as anyone knew it". Rolling Stone described Future Nostalgia as "the disco liberation soundtrack we need" during COVID-19 pandemic. 

The Daily Beast called the album a "apocalypse game-changer" and emphasized that it will "have us dancing until the world ends". The Wall Street Journal called Lipa "one of the biggest breakout stars of lockdown" due to the critical and commercial success of the album. According to BBC News, Lipa is one of the artists who brought the 80s back to the music industry. She was also one of the UK's most-played artist in 2020 as the album "proved to be the soundtrack to many people's quarantine, with its uplifting disco anthems providing the perfect antidote to isolation". Upon the release of Drake's Honestly, Nevermind and Beyoncé's Renaissance, both in 2022, some publications cited Future Nostalgia as the predictor of a house music revival.

Track listing

Notes
  – vocal production
 "Love Again" contains elements of "My Woman", written by Bing Crosby, Max Wartell and Irving Wallman and samples "My Woman" by Al Bowlly with Lew Stone and his Monseigneur Band.
 "Break My Heart" contains interpolations from "Need You Tonight" by INXS, written by Andrew Farriss and Michael Hutchence.
 All tracks on disc two of the Bonus edition credit as Lipa and The Blessed Madonna as lead artists and are noted as "mixed".
 Tainy is credited as a featured artist instead of co-lead artist on physical releases of Future Nostalgia: The Moonlight Edition.
 The title song lists Skylar Mones as an additional producer for the song's single release but not on album versions.

Personnel
Credits adapted from the liner notes of Future Nostalgia: The Moonlight Edition.

Standard edition
Musicians

 Dua Lipa vocals , songwriter 
 Jeff Bhasker drum programming 
 Emily Warren backing vocals 
 Drew Jurecka string arrangement, violin, viola, baritone violin, string engineer 
Tove Lo lyrics, backing vocals
 Tom Barnes drums, bass 
 Pete Kelleher synthesizer 
 Ben Kohn guitar 
 Stuart Price keyboards , drum programming , bass , guitar 
 Kamille backing vocals 
 Shakka backing vocals 
 Jason Evigan drums, synthesizer 
 Koz drums, synthesizer  bass , guitar 
 Todd Clark backing vocals 
 Clarence Coffee Jr. backing vocals 
 Sarah Hudson backing vocals 
 Paul Phamous backing vocals 
 Russell Graham keyboards 
 Bosko "Electrospit" Kante talkbox 
 Homer Steinweiss drums 
 Ian Kirkpatrick backing vocals, drum programming, guitar, keyboards 
 Julia Michaels backing vocals 
 SG Lewis drums, guitar, keyboards, synthesizer programming 
 Sophie Frances Cooke backing vocals, string arrangement 
 Alma Goodman backing vocals 
 Vanessa Luciano backing vocals 
 Ash Soan Tom Toms drums 
 Andrew Watt backing vocals, guitar, keyboards, tambourine 
 The Monsters & Strangerz keyboards 
 Chad Smith drums 
 Denzel Baptiste keys, drum programming, bass 
 David Biral keys, drum programming 
 Lindgren keys, drum programming 
 Melanie Fontana backing vocals 
 Taylor Upsahl backing vocals 
 Kennedi backing vocals 
 Dan Bingham piano 
 Isabel Gracefield piano engineering 
 Stagecoach Epsom Performing Arts Choir backing vocals 

Technical

 Jeff Bhasker production 
 Skylar Mones additional production 
 Homer Steinweiss drum kit 
 Jerry Singh additional programming 
 Dave Cerminera engineering 
 Jens Jungkurth engineering 
 Josh Gudwin mixing 
 Elijah Marrett-Hitch mix assisting 
 Chris Gehringer mastering 
 Will Quinnell assistant mastering 
 Ian Kirkpatrick production, engineering , programming, vocal production 
 Caroline Ailin additional vocal production 
 TMS production, vocal production 
 Stuart Price production , vocal production , mixing , additional production 
 Lorna Blackwood programming , vocal production , additional vocal recording 
 Cameron Gower Poole vocal engineering 
 Daniel Moyler engineering 
 Mark "Spike" Stent mixing 
 Michael Freeman assistant mixing 
 Matt Wolach assistant mixing 
 Jason Evigan production, engineering, vocal production 
 Koz production , vocal production 
 Gian Stone vocal production , engineering 
 Matt Snell assistant engineering 
 Rafael "Come2Brazil" Fadal additional engineering 
 Matty Green mixing 
 Phil Hotz assistant engineering 
 Juan Ariza additional production 
 SG Lewis production 
 Lauren D'Elia vocal production 
 Andrew Watt production, programming 
 The Monsters & Strangerz production, keyboards, programming 
 Paul Lamalfa engineering 
 Dave Kutch mastering 
 Lindgren production, engineering, vocal production 
 Take a Daytrip production, programming 
 DJ Swivel mixing 
 Rupert Christie additional production, arrangement, engineering 
 Jay Reynolds mixing 

Design
 Hugo Comte photography, creative direction
 Guillaume Sbalchiero graphic and logo design

The Moonlight Edition
Musicians

 Dua Lipa vocals , backing vocals 
 Angèle vocals 
 Tristan Salvati keyboards, percussion 
 Sly backing vocals, keyboards, live drums 
 Emily Warren backing vocals 
 Scott Harris backing vocals, guitar 
 Caroline Ailin backing vocals 
 Tara Siegel backing vocals 
 Zach Gurka backing vocals 
 Andreas Lund guitar 
 Miley Cyrus vocals, backing vocals 
 Andrew Watt backing vocals, bass, drums, guitar, keyboards 
 The Monsters & Strangerz backing vocals, keyboards 
 Jonathan Bellion backing vocals 
 Michael Pollack backing vocals 
 Oliver "Junior" Frid drum programming, percussion, synthesizer, keyboards, electric bass, electric guitar, backing vocals 
 Justin Parker keyboards, bass, guitar 
 Stuart Price keyboards, drum programming , bass 
 Lorna Blackwood backing vocals 
 Rich Cooper drums 
 Clarence Coffee Jr. backing vocals 
 JID featured vocals 
 Koz synthesizer, drums, guitar , bass 
 Sarah Hudson backing vocals 
 Vula Malinga additional vocals 
 Ed Travers additional vocals 
 DaBaby featured vocals 
 Paul Phamous backing vocals 
 Todd Clark backing vocals 
 Russell Graham keyboards 
 Bosko "Electrospit" Kante talkbox 
 Homer Steinweiss drums 

Technical

 Ian Kirkpatrick production, engineering, programming 
 Tristan Salvati additional production, vocal production, additional programming, engineering 
 Josh Gudwin mixing 
 Heidi Wang assistant mixing 
 Chris Gehringer mastering 
 Will Quinnell assistant mastering 
 Sly production, engineering, programming 
 Emily Warren vocal production 
 Scott Harris vocal production 
 Greg Eliason engineering 
 Brian Cruz assistant engineer 
 Miley Cyrus executive production 
 Andrew Watt production, executive production 
 The Monsters & Strangerz production
 Jonathan Bellion additional production 
 Paul LaMalfa engineering 
 Şerban Ghenea mixing 
 John Hanes engineering for mix 
 Randy Merrill mastering 
 Oliver "Junior" Frid production, engineering, programming 
 Mark "Spike" Stent mixing 
 Dave Emery mix assisting 
 Matt Wolach mix assisting 
 Justin Parker production, engineering 
 Stuart Price production , mixing 
 Lorna Blackwood programming , vocal production , additional vocal recording 
 Koz production , engineering , vocal production 
 Matt Snell engineering 
 Hal Ritson additional vocal engineering, programming 
 Richard Adlam additional vocal engineering, programming 
 Matty Green mixing 
 Phil Hotz assistant engineering 
 Cameron Gower Poole vocal engineering 
 Elijah Marrett-Hitch assistant mixing 
 Tainy production, recording 
 J Balvin executive production 
 Colin Leonard mastering 

Design
 Hugo Comte photography, creative direction
 Guillaume Sbalchiero graphic and logo design

Charts

Weekly charts

Year-end charts

Certifications and sales

Release history

See also 
 List of UK Albums Chart number ones of the 2020s
 List of UK Album Downloads Chart number ones of the 2020s
 List of number-one albums of 2020 (Scotland) 
 List of number-one albums of 2020 (Ireland) 
 List of number-one albums of 2020 (Australia)
 List of number-one albums from the 2020s (New Zealand)
 List of number-one albums of the 2020s (Czech Republic)
 List of number-one albums of 2020 (Finland)
 List of number-one albums of 2021 (Australia)
 List of number-one albums of 2021 (Spain)
 List of number-one albums of 2021 (Portugal)
 List of number-one albums of 2022 (Australia)

References

External links
 
 

2020 albums
Albums produced by Andrew Watt (record producer)
Albums produced by Jeff Bhasker
Albums produced by Stuart Price
Dua Lipa albums
Brit Award for British Album of the Year
Grammy Award for Best Pop Vocal Album
Warner Records albums
Albums produced by TMS (production team)
Albums produced by Take a Daytrip